Selling Sunset is an American reality television series created for Netflix by Adam DiVello. The series revolves around the Oppenheim Group, a high-end real estate brokerage firm in the Los Angeles area (with offices in West Hollywood and Newport Beach), and follows a group of agents as they navigate their personal and professional lives. The show first premiered on March 21, 2019.

Current cast 
Main
Heather El Moussa, 2019–present
Mary Fitzgerald, 2019–present
Brett Oppenheim, 2019–present
Jason Oppenheim, 2019–present
Chrishell Stause, 2019–present
Davina Potratz, (Recurring: 2019) 2020–present
Amanza Smith, 2020–present
Emma Hernan, 2021–present
Vanessa Villela, 2021–present
Chelsea Lazkani, 2022–present
Recurring
Romain Bonnet, (Main: 2020; Recurring: 2019) 2021–present

Overview and casting

Seasons 1–3
The first season premiered with eight episodes on March 21, 2019; featuring Mary Fitzgerald, Brett Oppenheim, Jason Oppenheim, Christine Quinn, Chrishell Stause, Maya Vander and Heather Rae El Moussa (then Young) as the main realtors, alongside Romain Bonnet and Davina Potratz who served in recurring capacities. 

The show returned for a second season on May 22, 2020; with the entire cast of the first season returning. Bonnet and Potratz were promoted to the main cast. Amanza Smith was added as the newest real estate agent and interior designer. The third season premiered on August 7, 2020; with the show's entire cast returning.

Season 4–present
On March 11, 2021, Netflix renewed the show for a fourth and fifth season. In 2021, the series was nominated for the Primetime Emmy Award for Outstanding Unstructured Reality Program.

The show returned for its fourth season on November 24, 2021; introducing Emma Hernan and Vanessa Villela as the latest additions to the series, whilst Bonnet was demoted to a recurring capacity. Chelsea Lazkani was added to the cast ahead of the show's fifth season, which premiered on April 22, 2022.

On June 23, 2022, Netflix renewed the show for a sixth and seventh season. Just before production started on the sixth season it was reported that main cast member Christine Quinn would not be returning for the show's sixth and seven seasons. Filming for the sixth season started in August 2022 around Los Angeles.

The series' sixth season is expected to premiere early 2023.

Cast
 Brett and Jason Oppenheim, co-founders of the Oppenheim Group, twin brothers
 Heather Rae El Moussa, real estate agent, former Playboy Playmate and actress, is married to television personality Tarek El Moussa 
 Mary Fitzgerald, real estate agent, previously dated Jason, marries Romain in season two's finale
 Christine Quinn, real estate agent, Chrishell's rival, marries entrepreneur Christian Richard in season three's finale
 Chrishell Stause, actress, real estate agent and recent addition to the Oppenheim Group, previously married to actor Justin Hartley
 Maya Vander, real estate agent, Israeli, commutes between Los Angeles and Miami
 Davina Potratz, real estate agent, joins rival agency Douglas Elliman and returns in season four
 Romain Bonnet, model, marries Mary in season two's finale
 Amanza Smith, real estate agent, interior designer, joins the Oppenheim Group from season two
 Emma Hernan, real estate agent, former Sports Illustrated model, Christine's rival, joins the Oppenheim Group from season four
 Vanessa Villela, real estate agent, Mexican-American novela star, joins the Oppenheim Group from season four
 Chelsea Lazkani, real estate agent, originally from London, joins the Oppenheim Group from season five

Timeline of cast members

Episodes

Season 1 (2019)

Season 2 (2020)

Season 3 (2020)

Season 4 (2021)

Season 5 (2022)

Production
Series creator Adam DiVello got the idea for the show when he saw an advertisement for the Oppenheim Group in a magazine. "I ripped it out and gave it to my development executive…and I said, ‘Call these people. Get me an interview with them,’” Divello told Vanity Fair in 2020. “It was pretty remarkable that it’s like an all-female ensemble cast, and these two twin brothers were running it. To me, it seemed like a no-brainer.”

Spin-offs
Netflix has announced two spin-offs of the show, Selling Tampa and Selling the OC. Selling Tampa premiered on December 15, 2021 with 8 episodes and follows the Allure Realty firm in Florida. Selling the OC follows the Oppenheim Group branch in Newport Beach. The show premiered on August 24, 2022 with 8 episodes.

Controversies 
Celebrities such as Chrissy Teigen have questioned the authenticity of the show. A long-term real estate agent in LA told the Mail that "The Oppenheim brothers are the real deal but none of us have ever come across the women they have working for them. It's clear these 'girls', as they call them on the show, were hired to make the show sizzle." Star Chrishell Stause has fought back against the accusations, going so far as to post a picture of her real estate license online to dismiss the rumors.

References

External links
 
 
 

2010s American reality television series
2019 American television series debuts
2020s American reality television series
English-language Netflix original programming
Property buying television shows
Television shows set in Los Angeles
Television series by Lionsgate Television